Jabbo is a nickname.  People with the name include:

Jabbo Andrews (1907–1964), American baseball player
Jasper "Jabbo" Phillips, lead singer of American soul vocal trio The Temprees
Jabbo Smith (1908–1991), American jazz musician

See also
Jabo § People with the given name or nickname